The two arrondissements of the Lozère department are:
 Arrondissement of Florac, (subprefecture: Florac-Trois-Rivières) with 38 communes.  The population of the arrondissement was 13,242 in 2016.  
 Arrondissement of Mende, (prefecture of the Lozère department: Mende) with 114 communes.  The population of the arrondissement was 63,180 in 2016.

History

In 1800 the arrondissements of Mende, Florac and Marvejols were established. The arrondissement of Marvejols was disbanded in 1926.

References

Lozere